Vibha Galhotra, born 1978 is an Indian conceptual artist based in New Delhi. Her work includes large-scale installations, sculptures, drawings, films that explore themes of ecological and environmental concerns. Her works address the shifting topography of the world under the impact of globalization and growth. She sees herself as being part of the restructuring of culture, society and geography – of New Delhi, and the world.

Early life and education 
Vibha Galhotra was born in Kaithal, Haryana in 1978. In 1999 she completed Bachelor in Fine Arts from the Government College of Arts, Chandigarh. In 2002 she completed her Master in Fine arts from Kala Bhavan in Santiniketan. She currently lives in New Delhi.

Career 
Galhotra is a conceptual artist. According to Art in America, Galhotra's work is concerned with urban development, global concerns and ecological issues. The Hindu has called her work about environmental issues "sharp and cutting." One of her "trademark" artistic conventions is the use of ghungroos.

Awards and Fellowships 
 Jerusalem International Fellows - Jerusalem, Israel, 2022
 Asia Art Future at Asia Art Game Changer Award India – 2019
 Rockefeller Grant at their Bellagio Center – 2016
 Asian Cultural Council Fellowship in the U.S.A. – 2017.
 YFLO Woman Achiever of the Year Award – 2015
 Inlaks Foundation Fine Arts Award – 2005-06
 The National Scholarship from the Human Resource Department, Government of India – 2001-02
 Artist Under 30 Award-Chandigarh State Lalit Kala Academy Award – 1998

Solo shows, projects, and participation

2022 - 23
 Silent Seasons- Nature Morte, New Delhi, India
 Breathing- Hamburger-Kunsthalle, Hamburg, Germany

2021
 We Do Not Dream Alone- Asia Society Triennial, New York

2020
 Beyond the Blue - Jackshainman Gallery New York, 2020
 Down to Earth  - Gropius Bau, Berlin, Germany
 Zero Waste - Museum of Fine Arts -Leipzig, Germany

2019
 Climateric - PLKA Gallery - Punjab Kala Bhawan - Chandigarh - India
 Brave New World  - Jack Shainman Gallery – New York

2018
 Facing India - Curated by Dr.Uta Ruhkamp - The Kunstmuseum Wolfsburg - Germany
 Delirium/Equilibrium- Curated by Roobina Karode - Kiran Nader Museum of Art - Delhi
 Art - Poetry: The Last Innocences - Instituto Cervantes - Delhi
 Mutations - IndoFrench Image Encounters curated by Rahaab Allana & Francois Cheval - New Delhi

2017
 Insanity in the Age of Reason - New Delhi - India
 Water Line: A Creative Exchange - Center for Visual Art | Metropolitan State University of Denver U.S.A.
 The Darkened Mirror: Global Perspectives on Water  '  San Jose Museum of Art, San Jose, CA, USA
 Unfiltered: An Exhibition About Water -  William Benton Museum of Art Connecticut U.S.A.
 Kailash Cartographies - Sheila C. Johnson Design Center - Parsons School of Design/The New School, New York
 Sculpture Park curated by Peter Nagy-Nahargarh Fort-Jaipur-India
 Hold...On. Buddha Enlightened Art & World Peace 2017 Buddha Enlightened, Art & World Peace 2017 Bodh Gaya India

2016
 Land Art Biennial LAM 360° Mongolia
 Where do we come from? What are we? Where are we going?  a Cook Book project India
 Meri Kahani Aankhon ki Jubaani a visual arts project with Apne Aap Women Worldwide.
 Garden of Dreams, a blindfold walk project, Kathmandu, Nepal

2015
 Absur–City–Pity–Dity - Jack Shainman Gallery, New York
 Winter in America - The School, Kinderhook, New York
 Piece by Piece- Building a Collection, Kemper Museum of Contemporary, Kansas City, Missouri
 Walking on the Planet, Casa Masaccio / Centro per l’arte Contemporanea, Corso, Italy

2014
 The Black Cloud Project - public participatory project, India
 Mise En Scène The School, Kinderhook, NY
 Past Tradition - Curated by Diana Campbell Betancourt,, New Delhi
 Forms of Activism- curated by Vivan Sundaram & Sasha Altaf, L K A, New Delhi
 Multiplicity- City as subject /Matter”, Curated by Marco Antonini, Nurture Art Gallery, New York
 Citizens of Time, curated by Veeranganakumari Solanki, Dhaka Art Summit
 Bright Noise- curated by Girish Shahane, Lalit Kala Academy, Chennai
 Is there love in this air- Art Oxygen, Mumbai

2013
 Sediments and Other Untitled... - Exhibit 320, New Delhi, India
 Alter - curated by Lucie Fontane, Mk search art gallery, Italy
 Icastica “Arezzo Biennial - Arezzo Italy
 Souvenir - curated by Lucie Fontane, Galerie Perrotin, Paris, France
 Sculpture on the Beach - Art Dubai, 2013. Curated by Chus Martinez
 Haein Art project Curated by Art O2 Haeinsa temple, Korea

2012
 Utopia of Difference- Jack Shainman Gallery, New York
 Metropia- Southeastern Center for Contemporary Art, Winston-Salem, North Carolina
 Re-BirthDay- Centro per l’Arte Contemporanea, Piazza Cavour, San Giovanni Valdarno, Italy 2011
 Neo Monster - an on-going public art project, displayed at different locations, New Delhi, Hornbill Festival Nagaland India/“Becoming” curated by Suresh Jairam, Colombo Art Biennial, Sri Lanka /Art Riga Latvia/ San Giovanni Valdarno, Italy
 Contemporary Renaissance- Casa Masaccio, San Giovanni Valdarno (Arezzo) Italy
 Becoming- Colombo Art Biennale - Sri Lanka “Theertha International Artists Collective”- Colombo, Sri Lanka

2010
 India Awakening Under the Banyan Tree- Essl Museum, Austria

2009Aluminum - 4th Baku Biennale, Azerbaijan
 Space Invader - Aicon Art Gallery, London, UK India
 Xianzai - Museum of Contemporary Art Shanghai, China

2008
 Metropia - Project 88, Mumbai, India
 Best of Discovery - Sh Contemporary , Shanghai, China
 Destination Asia: Flying over Stereotypes –  Conversation: Artists from Central Asia and South Asia, Dubai

2006
 Where Do We Come From? What are we? Where Are We Going? - New Delhi, India
 Brazier International Artists Workshop UK

2005
 Between Me and Delhi - Anant Art Gallery, New Delhi, India
 Unclaimed Luggage - Artrageous Group Cyprus
 Bag Factory Fordsburg Artist Studio (Bag Factory) -South Africa

2004
  White - MS University, Baroda, India

2002
 Space within the Space'' - Max Mueller Bhavan, New Delhi, India

Collections 
Her work has been shown or is in the collections of the Kiran Nadar Museum of Arts, Pizzuti Collection, Casa Masaccio Arte Contemporanea, the Singapore Art Museum, Essl Museum, Austria, Devi Art Foundation, India, and Europas Park.

References

External links 
 
 Interview (2013)
 A Question to Herself, Led to a Turn in Her Work (2016 video)

1978 births
Living people
Artists from Chandigarh
Women artists from Delhi
People from New Delhi
Government College of Art, Chandigarh alumni